This article contains a list of notable flashcard software. Flashcards are widely used as a learning drill to aid memorization by way of spaced repetition.

Software

Platform support

References 

 
Classic Mac OS software
Utilities for macOS
Utilities for Windows
Utilities for Linux
Android (operating system) software
BlackBerry software
Palm OS software
 
Software
Lists of software